Ahmed Eid Abdel Malek Abdou (born May 15, 1980) is an Egyptian retired footballer, who last played for El Gouna in the Egyptian Premier League. He is known for his time at Haras El Hodood and Zamalek. He also played for national side Egypt. He is an attacking midfielder.

Club career

Early career
He started his career in Zamalek youth team and transferred to Aswan. He scored 5 goals in the 2003–04 Egyptian Premier League.

Haras El Hodood
He joined Alexandria's side Haras El Hodood in 2004. In October 2008, the club won the Egypt Cup after beating ENPPI on penalties in the final.

Abdel Malek is also famous for scoring the fastest goal in African football history, finding the net after only ten seconds of the 2006 CAF Confederation Cup game between Haras El Hedood and Guinean side Kalom.

Zamalek
He joined Zamalek in 2013.

After winning Egyptian Premier League, Eid announced on instagram that he will not continue his career in Zamalek. He was released from his contract.

International career
Abdel Malek made his debut with Egyptian national team in 2005 against Uganda. He was included in the 2006 African Cup of Nations winning squad. The Haras El-Hodood skipper found his form with the national team again during the 2010 FIFA World Cup qualifiers in which he scored 2 decisive goals in two consecutive games against DR Congo and Djibouti., He was included in the Egypt's Squad in 2009 Confederations Cup, he was given no 10 after the dismiss of Emad Moteab due to injury.

In early 2010, Hassan Shehata, Egypt's head coach, named Abdel Malek among the Egyptian squad that will defend its title in the 2010 African Cup of Nations .

International goals
Scores and results list Egypt's goal tally first.

Honors

Club
Haras El-Hodoud
Egypt Cup: 2008–09, 2009–10
Egyptian Super Cup: 2010
Zamalek SC
Egyptian Premier League: 2014–15
Egypt Cup: 2012–13, 2013–14

International
Egypt
African Cup of Nations: 2006, 2010

References

External links
 

1980 births
Living people
Egyptian footballers
Egypt international footballers
2009 FIFA Confederations Cup players
2006 Africa Cup of Nations players
2010 Africa Cup of Nations players
Egyptian expatriate footballers
Expatriate footballers in Libya
Haras El Hodoud SC players
Al Masry SC players
Wadi Degla SC players
Zamalek SC players
Al-Ahly SC (Benghazi) players
Egyptian Premier League players
Association football midfielders
Libyan Premier League players
Egyptian expatriate sportspeople in Libya
Aswan SC players
El Gouna FC players